Tahoe Donner Downhill is a small ski resort with five ski lifts and 14+ trails, in Truckee, California  northeast of Donner Pass. There are two chairlifts and three conveyor lifts.

References

External links
Tahoe Donner Downhill official website

Sierra Nevada (United States)
Ski areas and resorts in California
Companies based in Nevada County, California
Tourist attractions in Nevada County, California
Buildings and structures in Nevada County, California